, also known as , is an uninhabited island in Tonaki, Okinawa Prefecture, Japan. Ceramics, including kamui ware and celadons, are evidence of human activity on the island over the longue durée. Public access is now prohibited since, under the designation FAC (Facilities Admin Code) 6078,  is a live-fire training area for the United States Forces Japan.

See also

 Tonaki Prefectural Natural Park
 Desert island
 List of islands

References

External links
 US Military Issues in Okinawa

Islands of Okinawa Prefecture
Uninhabited islands of Japan
United States Armed Forces in Okinawa Prefecture